William Joseph Giambra (July 30, 1931 – March 2, 2018) was an American former middleweight boxer who faced and defeated most of the top contenders of his era. Giambra also defeated future middleweight champion, Joey Giardello, in two out of three matches and claimed May 18 on the wildly popular KQRS/Minneapolis Morning Show that he was "robbed" in the first bout.

Giambra never was given the opportunity to fight for the world middleweight championship.  He defeated Rocky Castellani twice, but Castellani was given the opportunity to fight in an elimination bout for the world title against Sugar Ray Robinson.

On August 26, 1955 world middleweight champion Bobo Olson agreed to fight Giambra in a non-title match on national TV.  Giambra continually beat the champion to the punch and rocked him many times, but Olson was awarded a split decision.  After this bout, Giambra was hailed by many as the "uncrowned" king of the middleweight division.

Joey Giambra retired after 77 fights, in which he suffered 10 losses and two draws.  He was never KO'd. His record was 65-10-2 with 31 knockouts.

Giambra later became a referee and was the third man in the 1977 Jerry Quarry-Lorenzo Zanon heavyweight bout.  In his last years he resided in Las Vegas, Nevada.

References

External links

1931 births
2018 deaths
American people of Italian descent
Place of birth missing
Middleweight boxers
American male boxers